is a Japanese illustrator and manga artist. With his work consisting of 4-panel comics, Okawa debuted professionally in 2008 with the manga series Super Elegant and rose to popularity with his 2014 series Pop Team Epic. Okawa is also a regular contributing artist for the Ensemble Stars! media franchise.

Career
Prior to making his commercial debut, Okawa drew  under the circle name Fuminbain. In 2008, he released his first series, Super Elegant, through Dengeki G's Festival! Comic. In addition to drawing manga, as a contributor, Okawa regularly collaborates with other franchises such as Ensemble Stars! and King of Prism.

On October 3, 2021, Okawa launched a YouTube channel to celebrate his 35th birthday. He later debuted as a VTuber on June 21, 2022, using a model designed by Nekosuke Okogemaru and sold on the resource website Nizima.

Copyright violations
Okawa's Twitter account was temporarily suspended on June 8, 2018. After his account was reinstated, Okawa stated that the reason for the suspension was due to copyright infringement from a drawing he posted of MS-09B Dom from Mobile Suit Gundam; however, some online commenters have discussed that the suspension may have been a result of a coordinated attack from his detractors or from flippant death threats Okawa had made towards Lawson.

On October 4, 2018, manga artist Buichi Terasawa accused Okawa of copyright infringement over a collaboration sweatshirt from Pop Team Epic and fashion brand Candy Stripper. The sweatshirt had parodied Terasawa's manga series Cobra and directly referenced the series in its product description. Okawa posted an apology, while the sweatshirt was removed from sale.

Personal life
On April 30, 2022, Okawa announced through Twitter that he had gotten married. Prior to this, he and his wife had been living together since 2020.

Works

As creator

As contributor

References

1986 births
Japanese illustrators
Japanese YouTubers
Living people
VTubers